Diethelm Ferner (born 13 July 1941) is a German former football coach and player. As a player, he spent eight seasons in the Bundesliga with SV Werder Bremen and Rot-Weiss Essen. He represented Germany in two friendlies.

Honours and achievements

Player
Werder Bremen
 Bundesliga: 1964–65

Coach
Apollon Limassol
 Cypriot First Division: 1990–91, 1993–94

Zamalek
 CAF Champions League: 1996

References

External links
 

Living people
1941 births
Association football midfielders
German footballers
Germany international footballers
Bundesliga players
SV Werder Bremen players
Rot-Weiss Essen players
German football managers
FC St. Pauli managers
Hannover 96 managers
FC Schalke 04 managers
Iraklis Thessaloniki F.C. managers
Alemannia Aachen managers
Apollon Limassol FC managers
AEL Limassol managers
Zamalek SC managers
Al Jahra SC managers
German expatriate football managers
Expatriate football managers in Lebanon
German expatriate sportspeople in Lebanon
Lebanon national football team managers
Al Ittihad Alexandria Club managers
Olympiakos Nicosia managers
Expatriate football managers in Greece
Expatriate football managers in Cyprus
Expatriate football managers in Kuwait
Rot-Weiss Essen managers
Wuppertaler SV managers
Kavala F.C. managers
People from East Prussia
German expatriate sportspeople in Greece
German expatriate sportspeople in Cyprus
Expatriate football managers in Egypt
German expatriate sportspeople in Egypt
Expatriate football managers in Sudan
German expatriate sportspeople in Sudan
Expatriate football managers in Libya
German expatriate sportspeople in Libya
Kuwait Premier League managers
West German football managers
West German footballers
West German expatriate football managers
West German expatriate sportspeople in Greece